List of The Handmaid's Tale characters may refer to:

 The Handmaid's Tale#Characters, a list of characters from the novel
 List of The Handmaid's Tale (TV series) characters, a list of characters from the TV series